The girls' 55 kg  competition in taekwondo at the 2010 Summer Youth Olympics in Singapore took place on August 17. A total of 11 women competed in this event, limited to fighters whose body weight was less than 55 kilograms. Preliminaries started at 14:00, quarterfinals started at 15:22, semifinals at 18:30 and the final at 19:53. Two bronze medals were awarded at the Taekwondo competitions.

Medalists

Results
Legend
PTG — Won by Points Gap
SUP — Won by Superiority
OT — Won on over time (Golden Point)

Main bracket

References
 Draw

Taekwondo at the 2010 Summer Youth Olympics